Amanat (Punjabi: is a 1981 Pakistani comedy and romance film, directed and produced by Rangeela.

Cast
 Rangeela – Badshah
 Ghulam Mohayuddin – 'Doctor'
 Bazgha –  Chambaily (double role)
 Talat Siddiqui – mother of Chambaily
 Aslam Pervaiz – Halaku Khan
 Iqbal Bukhari
 Anyila – child actress
 Allauddin
 Masood Akhtar
 Mazhar Shah
 Ali Ijaz
 Saqi

Track list
The music of the film is by musician Kamal Ahmed. The lyrics were written by Waris Ludhianvi and Khawaja Pervez. The singers were:
 Mehdi Hassan
 Mehnaz
 Ghulam Abbas
 Naheed Akhtar

References

External links
 

Pakistani romantic comedy-drama films
1981 films
Punjabi-language Pakistani films
1980s Punjabi-language films
1980s romantic comedy-drama films
1981 comedy films